Joan Rand Moschovakis is a logician and mathematician focusing on intuitionistic logic and mathematics.  She is professor emerita at Occidental College and a guest at UCLA.

Moschovakis earned her Ph.D. from the University of Wisconsin–Madison in 1965 under the direction of Stephen Kleene, with a dissertation entitled Disjunction, Existence and *-Eliminability in Formalized Intuitionistic Analysis.

Moschovakis is married to Yiannis Moschovakis, with whom she gave the 2014 Lindström Lectures at the University of Gothenburg.

Selected publications

References

External links
 Home page
 

1938 births
Living people
Scientists from Athens
University of Wisconsin–Madison alumni
20th-century Greek mathematicians
21st-century  American mathematicians
American logicians
University of California, Los Angeles faculty
20th-century women mathematicians
21st-century women mathematicians
Greek emigrants to the United States